Kattunaval is a village in the Gandaravakottai revenue block of Pudukkottai district, Tamil Nadu, India.

Demographics 
As per the 2001 census, Kattunaval had a total population of 2790 with 1390 males and 1400 females. Out of the total  
population 1673 people were literate.

References

Villages in Pudukkottai district